Bandel is a neighbourhood in the Hooghly district of the Indian state of West Bengal. It is founded by Portuguese settlers and falls under the jurisdiction of Chandernagore Police Commissionerate. It is a part of the area covered by Kolkata Metropolitan Development Authority (KMDA). Bandel is a major rail junction station of Eastern Railway zone, it is 40 km from Howrah railway station.

Geography

Location
The main river that flows by Bandel is Hooghly. The town is in Gangetic Plain.

Climate
Like the rest of the Ganges Delta of West Bengal, the climate is tropical wet-and-dry in nature. A prolonged hot and humid weather is the main characteristic of the climate of Bandel. The monsoon stays from early June to mid-September. Winter persists for almost three months, from mid-November to mid-February. The weather remains dry during the winter and humid during summer.

Economy
Dunlop Factory: The famous Dunlop factory is situated at Sahaganj near Bandel. However, it has been shut down owing to some issues in its administration.
BTPS: Bandel Thermal Power Station was started with a capacity of 82.5 MW in 1965. It has since been expanded and currently has a rated capacity of 530 MW. It is operated under the West Bengal Power Development Corporation (WBPDCL).
A Company named Jupiter Wagons Limited is located at sahaganj area which manufactures railway wagons.Bakery: Bandel is the base of many bakery industries.
Bandel Bazar: Bandel Bazar is one of the biggest and important markets of the district. It's the hub of agricultural import and export. Vegetables, fruits (especially mango, watermelon) and rice are exported from the market.Banks: At Bandel, there are branches of banks such as Allahabad Bank, Axis Bank, Bandhan Bank, Bank of Baroda, Canara Bank, Punjab & Sind Bank, State Bank of India, UCO Bank, and, HDFC Bank. Jupiter Wagons Ltd: Jupiter, an engineering company which manufacture railway based products such as Fright Wagons, Bogie & CMS Crossings, is located in front of Bandel ITI.

Transport

Train

Bandel Junction is an important railway station of Eastern Railway and is a model rail station. The station is situated approximately 40  km from Howrah station on the Howrah–Bardhaman main line. The Bandel–Katwa line meets the Howrah main line, here at Bandel Jn. Another branch line connects Bandel with Sealdah railway station and Kolkata railway station via . An EMU car-shed, as well as a goods yard, is situated in the neighbourhood of Bandel station.

Road and bus
State Highway 6/Grand Trunk Road passes through Bandel.

Private bus
 4 Chunchura Court - Memari
 8 Chunchura Court - Kalna
 23 Chunchura Court - Tarakeswar
 17 Chinsurah to Tarakeswar
Besides, there are auto rickshaws, e-rickshaws, cycle-rickshaws, etc. These all contribute to the public transport of Bandel.

Air
The nearby airport is the Netaji Subhas Chandra Bose International Airport in Dum Dum, Kolkata.

Festivals
Like other parts of West Bengal, Durga Puja is the biggest festival of Bandel. Kartik Puja is one of the famous festivals celebrated in Bandel (Sahaganj-Bansberia area). Also Lakshmi Puja, Kali Puja, Viswakarma Puja, Saraswati Puja, Poila Boisakh-Ganesh Puja, Chhat Puja, Dol Yatra are widely celebrated at Bandel. Olichandi Mela (fair) is the biggest fair observed at Bandel in early summer after the Dol Yatra. Christmas is well attended at Bandel church. Eid is the major festival celebrated by the Muslim community of Bandel. Another festival, 'Sitla puja', is exclusive to Bandel, which is celebrated few weeks after the Dol Yatra.

Education

Schools

 Don Bosco School Bandel
 Auxilium Convent School Bandel
 Kendriya Vidyalaya Bandel
 Abbot Shishu Hall
 Bandel St.John's High School
 Hooghly Girls' High School
 Blooming Buds School
 Disha Public School
 Binodini Girls' High School
 Dunlop English Medium School
 Bandel Vidyamandir High School (Established in 1953)
 Hooghly Gour Hari Harijan Vidya Mandir
 Bandel Mahatma Gandhi Hindi Vidyalaya (Established in 1956)
 Bandel Branch High School

Engineering colleges
 Modern Institute of Engineering and Technology
 West Bengal Survey Institute
 ITI College, Bandel

Nearby places

Debanandapur
Debanandapur is the birthplace of the Bengali author Sarat Chandra Chattopadhyay and is about 3 km west from Bandel Station. His dwelling house is still there.  There also is a library named Sarat Smrithi Pathagar, which includes a museum room containing the things used by the famous writer. The village has some 19th-century atchala temples. It is one of the seven important villages named Saptagram at the time of Mughals.

Sahaganj
Sahaganj is 4 km from Bandel station. A unit of Dunlop India Ltd. is located here. Ruias purchased Dunlop India Ltd. from the Dubai-based Jumbo group owned by late Manu Chhabria. The postal code is 712104. and resumed production in January 2007 after 8 years. After few months of starting production Ruias also stopped production again, till December 2012 there is no hope of light for the workers. Jupiter, an engineering company which manufacture railway based products such as Fright Wagons, Bogie & CMS Crossings, is located in front of Bandel ITI.

Tribeni

Tribeni is 8 km from Bandel on the Bandel–Katwa line. Tribeni Tissues Limited, a specialty paper manufacturing company and a major supplier of tissue paper to the cigarette industry, is located at Tribeni. It was taken over by ITC in 1990. Tribeni in West Bengal is derived from the junction of three rivers Hooghly (A branch of Ganges), Kunti & Swaraswati. Tribeni burning ghat has Hindu Religious values.

The one of the biggest Thermal Power Station is also situated here which known as Bandel Thermal Power Station(BTPS).

Other places
 Naihati - 1 km
 Mogra - 7 km
 Bansberia - 4 km

References

Cities and towns in Hooghly district
Neighbourhoods in Kolkata
Kolkata Metropolitan Area